R. Brad von Gillern is a member of the Nebraska Legislature for District 4 from Elkhorn, Nebraska. He was elected to the Nebraska Legislature on November 8, 2022.

von Gillern was named President of Lueder Construction in Omaha, Nebraska, in 2000 and acquired majority ownership of Lueder Construction in 2006. He served as president and then CEO until 2021, when he sold his remaining interest in the business.

Political positions
Brad von Gillern describes himself as pro-life.

Electoral history

References

Republican Party Nebraska state senators
21st-century American politicians
Living people
1960 births